Rutland is an unincorporated community located in the town of Rutland, Dane County, Wisconsin, United States.

Notes

Unincorporated communities in Dane County, Wisconsin
Unincorporated communities in Wisconsin